In quantum chromodynamics (and also N = 1 super quantum chromodynamics) with massless flavors, if the number of flavors, Nf, is sufficiently small (i.e. small enough to guarantee asymptotic freedom, depending on the number of colors), the theory can flow to an interacting conformal fixed point of the renormalization group. If the value of the coupling at that point is less than one (i.e. one can perform perturbation theory in weak coupling), then the fixed point is called a Banks–Zaks fixed point.  The existence of the fixed point was first reported in 1974 by Belavin and Migdal and by Caswell, and later used by Banks and Zaks  in their analysis of the phase structure of vector-like gauge theories with massless fermions. The name Caswell–Banks–Zaks fixed point is also used.

More specifically, suppose that we find that the beta function of a theory up to two loops has the form

 

Then there exists a value  such that :

 

It follows that when the theory flows to the IR it is a conformal, weakly coupled theory with coupling .

For the case of a non-Abelian gauge theory with gauge group  and Dirac fermions in the fundamental representation of the gauge group for the flavored particles we have

where  is the number of colors and  the number of flavors. Then  should lie just below  in order for the Banks–Zaks fixed point to appear.
 
where the lower bound comes from requiring . The coefficient  was first correctly computed by Caswell, while the earlier paper by Belavin and Migdal  has a wrong answer.

See also
 Beta function

References

 T. J. Hollowood, "Renormalization Group and Fixed Points in Quantum Field Theory", Springer, 2013, .

Gauge theories
Quantum chromodynamics
Fixed points (mathematics)
Renormalization group
Conformal field theory
Supersymmetric quantum field theory